Pedro Guerrero (born June 29, 1956) is a Dominican former professional baseball player. He played fifteen seasons in Major League Baseball from 1978 to 1992 with the Los Angeles Dodgers and St. Louis Cardinals.

Early life
Pedro Guerrero was born on June 29, 1956, in San Pedro de Macorís on the east coast of the Dominican Republic. Guerrero was barely a teenager when he left school to support his family by cutting cane for the island's rum industry. His earnings were less than $3 USD a week for the heavy field labor. The young teenager provided for his divorced mother and siblings by day, but enjoyed playing the drums by night and participated in organized baseball on weekends. By age 16, the hard-hitting Guerrero stood out amongst his peers in a local youth league, primarily at third base.

Latin scouting pioneer Reggie Otero, representing the Cleveland Indians, traveled to San Pedro to scout Guerrero. Otero described his first impression of the Dominican prodigy as follows: "He was five-feet-11, 157 pounds. I looked at the width of his shoulders, back and front, and knew that he would get heavier and stronger. He had lived off of rice and beans."  In late 1972, Otero offered Guerrero a pro contract, which included a $2,500 bonus to be paid out on New Year's Day of 1973.

Career
At age 17, Guerrero began his career with a season of rookie ball in the remote Gulf Coast League. In April 1974, the Indians, seeking pitching help, traded Guerrero to the Los Angeles Dodgers for minor league, left-handed pitcher Bruce Ellingsen. Dodgers personnel director Al Campanis had recently hired Reggie Otero, who then recommended the acquisition of Guerrero.  Ellingsen pitched only 16 major league games; contrasted with Guerrero's all-star career, the trade ranks as one of the most lop-sided straight-up swaps in baseball history.

Guerrero would wait several years before breaking in with the parent club and becoming a full-time big league player. Los Angeles won three pennants between 1974 and 1978, receiving a steady supply of pitching talent from Triple-A Albuquerque and gaining even more assets through trades and the free agency. Meanwhile, Guerrero shined in the minors. He hit .300 or better in six seasons and was named to minor league All-Star teams at both first and third base. In 1977, he was leading the Pacific Coast League at AAA Albuquerque with a .403 batting average, when he fractured his left ankle in the field. The injury cost him a call-up to the majors.

Los Angeles Dodgers
Guerrero finally broke into the big leagues in late 1978. His first major league at-bat came in the fifth inning of a September blowout loss against Randy Jones and the San Diego Padres. Pedro pinch-hit for former minor-league roommate and future nemesis Rick Sutcliffe, and singled for the first of his 1,618 hits. Exactly one year later, he hit his first major league home run off Padres pitcher Bob Owchinko, appearing in 25 games total in 1979. Pedro made significant contributions to the parent club in 1980. He filled a valuable utility role over two stretches during the season, spelling an ailing Davey Lopes at second and a slumping Rudy Law in center. Overall, Guerrero played six different positions in 1980 and batted an impressive .322 with 7 homers and 31 RBI in 183 at-bats.

At the start of the 1981 season, incumbent right fielder Reggie Smith was rehabilitating from an arm injury, which opened a spot in right field for Guerrero.  The first half of the season was going well, with a batting average of .325 and the Dodgers atop their division, when a players' strike halted the season in early June. After the season resumed in August, Guerrero won the first of five All-Star nods. Guerrero batted only .269 in the second half of the split campaign as the Dodgers posted a mediocre 27–26 record the rest of the way, but the Dodgers were guaranteed a playoff spot for their first-half lead. Guerrero's slump continued into the postseason. The Dodgers were pushed to the brink in two consecutive playoff rounds against Houston and Montreal, but managed to overcome deficits in each series. The Dodgers again faced the New York Yankees in the 1981 World Series, their third Fall Classic matchup in five years. Guerrero factored into three straight wins in Games 3–5, but his crowning performance in Game 6 sealed the series for the Dodgers. In that final game, Pedro totaled five RBIs and eight total bases amassed on a triple, homer, and bases loaded single. The one-man show capped a 9–2 victory and gave the Dodgers' their first World Series title in 16 years. Guerrero was named co-MVP of the Series along with teammates Ron Cey and Steve Yeager.

In 1982, Guerrero won a Silver Slugger Award for his offensive performance as an outfielder. He also became the first Dodger to hit 30 home runs and steal 20 bases in a season, and he did it again the following year. In 1985, Guerrero tied a major league record with 15 home runs in June, and also tied the Los Angeles season record of 33. He reached base 14 consecutive times that year, two short of the record set by Ted Williams, and led the league in slugging, on-base and home run percentage.

Guerrero was an aggressive base runner but a poor slider. He ruptured a tendon sliding in spring training and missed most of the 1986 season, after which he ran less frequently. But in 1987, he batted .338 and won the UPI's Comeback Player of the Year award. His batting average that year was the highest by any Dodger since the .346 recorded by Tommy Davis in 1962.

The Dodgers shifted him from the outfield to a starter at third base as a replacement for the departing Ron Cey. He also played sporadically at first base as the need arose. Although he gained a reputation for being shaky at third, he was statistically one of the best in the league at getting to the ball.

St. Louis Cardinals
During Los Angeles' 1988 championship season, he was traded to the Cardinals for pitcher John Tudor.

In 1989, Guerrero earned MVP consideration, batting .311 with 17 home runs, a career-high 117 RBIs and a league-high 42 doubles. His production fell off sharply afterwards. In 1992, a shoulder injury limited him to 43 games, and he finished his major league career batting just .219 with one home run for the season.

Independent leagues and Mexico
In 1993, after becoming a free agent and not finding a new major league team, Guerrero signed with the independent Sioux Falls Canaries of the Northern League. He split the season between the Canaries and the Charros de Jalisco of the Mexican League. He returned to the Canaries in 1994, then made one more attempt at a comeback in 1995 with the Midland Angels, the Double-A farm team of the California Angels before retiring.

Career statistics
In 1,536 games spanning 15 seasons, Guerrero recorded a .300 batting average (1,618-for-5,392) with 730 runs, 267 doubles, 29 triples, 215 home runs, 898 RBI, 97 stolen bases, 609 base on balls, .370 on-base percentage and .480 slugging percentage. He posted a .977 fielding percentage playing at all three outfield positions and at first, second and third base. In 26 postseason games, Guerrero hit .225 (20-for-89) with 7 runs, 4 home runs, 16 RBI and 13 walks.

Coaching career
Guerrero was out of baseball until 2011 when his former teammate Mike Marshall, then Commissioner of the Arizona Winter League, hired him as a hitting instructor.  For 2012, Guerrero was named the manager of the Tijuana Truenos of the Liga Norte de Mexico.  In 2013 Guerrero was named the manager of the Vallejo Admirals in the Pacific Association of Professional Baseball Clubs.  Guerrero was relieved of his manager duties in July when a new ownership group took over the team.  In 2014, he was named manager of the Rieleros de Frontera in the Liga del Norte in the city of Monclova in the Mexican minor leagues. Guerrero led the Rieleros to the Liga del Norte championship where they defeated the Palau Tuzos 4 games to 2 to win the league title.

Personal life

In 1980, Pedro met his future wife, Denise. The couple were soon married and moved into a condominium in the Wilshire District of Los Angeles.

In September 1999, Guerrero was arrested for attempting to buy 33 pounds of cocaine from an undercover agent. In June 2002, he was acquitted of drug conspiracy charges after his attorney argued his client did not understand the full implications of the alleged drug deal.

In April 2017, Guerrero suffered a serious stroke while in New York. Doctors feared he was brain dead, but after more testing, it was discovered he was in a coma. The next morning he made what was considered a miraculous recovery and was moved out of ICU, speaking to friends and family.

See also

 List of Major League Baseball annual doubles leaders
 List of Major League Baseball annual putouts leaders
 List of Major League Baseball players from the Dominican Republic
 List of St. Louis Cardinals team records
 Los Angeles Dodgers award winners and league leaders

References

External links

1956 births
Living people
Albuquerque Dukes players
Bellingham Dodgers players
Charros de Jalisco players
Danville Dodgers players
Dominican Republic expatriate baseball players in the United States
Gulf Coast Indians players

Los Angeles Dodgers players
Louisville Redbirds players
Major League Baseball first basemen
Major League Baseball left fielders
Major League Baseball players from the Dominican Republic
Midland Angels players
National League All-Stars
Orangeburg Dodgers players
Sportspeople from San Pedro de Macorís
Silver Slugger Award winners
Sioux Falls Canaries players
St. Louis Cardinals players
Waterbury Dodgers players
World Series Most Valuable Player Award winners